Jordan Leon Chidubem Gibbons (born 18 November 1993) is an English footballer who plays as a defender for Chesham United.

Club career
A product of Queens Park Rangers youth academy he was given professional contract in 2011. On 23 August 2011 he was an unused substitute against Rochdale. On 29 January 2013, Scottish Premier League team Inverness Caledonian Thistle signed him on loan until the end of the season. His signing to the club was followed by Charlie Taylor's loan arrival from Leeds United. In the next day he made his league debut against St Mirren in a 2–1 loss coming as an 89th-minute substitute for Aaron Doran.

Following his release from QPR, Gibbons signed for League Two side Yeovil Town on a one-year contract ahead of the 2015–16 season. He was released at the end of the 2015–16 season. Having been released by Yeovil, Gibbons called time on his professional football career having struggled with injury.

In November 2016, it was announced that Gibbons would return to football to join Isthmian League Premier Division side Wingate & Finchley. On 19 November 2016, Gibbons made his Wingate & Finchley debut in a 4–1 victory against Canvey Island, replacing Ola Williams in the 39th minute.

On 28 April 2017, after a spell with Kingstonian, Gibbons joined recently founded American side Phoenix Rising.

In March 2018 Gibbons signed for Brighton-based National League South side Whitehawk.

On 30 July 2019, Gibbons signed for Chelmsford City from Welling United, after spending the 2018–19 season with the latter. In August 2019, after a solitary appearance in a 4–1 defeat against Weymouth, Chelmsford assistant manager Nick Haycock confirmed the departure of Gibbons due to injury problems.

Gibbons re-signed for Whitehawk in October 2019 and made his second debut in a 2–1 defeat at Faversham Town on 5 October 2019, before moving to Dartford after one further cup appearance.

Ahead of the 2021–22 campaign, Gibbons returned to Wingate & Finchley, following a third spell back at Whitehawk in March 2020. In November 2021, he was on the move again, when he signed for Southern Football League Premier Division South side Chesham United, making his debut against Hendon.

Career statistics

References

External links

1993 births
Living people
English footballers
English expatriate footballers
Association football midfielders
Queens Park Rangers F.C. players
Inverness Caledonian Thistle F.C. players
Yeovil Town F.C. players
Hanwell Town F.C. players
Wingate & Finchley F.C. players
Kingstonian F.C. players
Phoenix Rising FC players
Whitehawk F.C. players
Welling United F.C. players
Chelmsford City F.C. players
Dartford F.C. players
Chesham United F.C. players
Scottish Premier League players
English Football League players
Isthmian League players
Southern Football League players
USL Championship players
English expatriate sportspeople in the United States
Expatriate soccer players in the United States